is a district located in Ishikawa Prefecture, Japan.

As of 2003, the district has an estimated population of 62,374 and a density of 476.79 persons per km2. The total area is 130.82 km2.

Towns and villages
The district has two towns:

 Tsubata
 Uchinada

History

Recent mergers
 On March 1, 2004 - The towns of Takamatsu, Nanatsuka and Unoke were merged to form the city of Kahoku.

Districts in Ishikawa Prefecture